Yoma Paw Kya Tae Myet Yay is a 2019 Burmese drama film starring Myint Myat, Htoo Aung, Aung Yay Chan, Kaung Myat San, Lin Aung Khit, Eaindra Kyaw Zin, Khine Thin Kyi, May Myint Mo. The film, produced by Bo Bo Film Production premiered in Myanmar on November 7, 2019.

Cast
Myint Myat as Tin Maung Win
Htoo Aung as Aung Lwin
Aung Yay Chan as Win Chit
Kaung Myat San as San Naing
Lin Aung Khit as Hla Win Aung
Eaindra Kyaw Zin as Ko Toe
Khine Thin Kyi as Phyu Phyu Myint
May Myint Mo as Malar
Khin Hlaing as Tin Soe
Min Thu as U Khin Maung
Thel Nandar Soe as Khin Mar Aye
Zaw Maing as Po Daung

References

2019 films
2010s Burmese-language films
Burmese drama films
Films shot in Myanmar
2019 drama films